Kampong Bengkurong is a village in Brunei-Muara District, Brunei, on the outskirts of the capital Bandar Seri Begawan. The population was 3,583 in 2016. It is one of the villages within Mukim Kilanas. The postcode is BF1920.

Administration 

The village head oversees the village proper, as well as the villages of Kampong Burong Lepas and Kampong Sinarubai.

Facilities 
Bengkurong Primary School is the village primary school, whereas Pengiran Muda Abdul Malik Religious School is the village school for the country's Islamic religious primary education.

The village mosque is Kampong Bengkurong Mosque; it was inaugurated on 26 February 1988 and can accommodate 800 worshippers.

References 

Bengkurong